Harry Hooper was a baseball player.

Harry Hooper may also refer to:

 Harry Hooper (footballer, born 1900) (Harold Hooper, 1900–1963), defender with Leicester City, Southampton and Queens Park Rangers
 Harry Hooper (footballer, born 1910) (1910–1970), defender with Sheffield United
 Harry Hooper (footballer, born 1933) (Harold Hooper), winger with West Ham United, Wolverhampton Wanderers, Birmingham City and Sunderland
 Harry Hooper (cricketer) (born 1986), English cricketer

See also
 Henry Hooper (disambiguation)
 Harold Hooper (disambiguation)